Dicheirotrichus is a genus of beetles in the family Carabidae, containing the following species:

 Dicheirotrichus abdominalis (Motschulsky, 1844)  
 Dicheirotrichus alticola Bates, 1878 
 Dicheirotrichus angularis (Reitter In Tschitscherine, 1899) 
 Dicheirotrichus angustulus J.Sahlberg, 1880 
 Dicheirotrichus arnoldii (Kryzhanovskij & Atamuradov, 1989) 
 Dicheirotrichus bradycelliformis Reitter, 1900 
 Dicheirotrichus chloroticus (Dejean, 1829) 
 Dicheirotrichus cognatus (Gyllenhal, 1827) 
 Dicheirotrichus coreanus Mlynar, 1974 
 Dicheirotrichus cymindiformis (Reitter, 1901) 
 Dicheirotrichus desertus (Motschulsky, 1849) 
 Dicheirotrichus discicollis (Dejean, 1829) 
 Dicheirotrichus discolor (Faldermann, 1836) 
 Dicheirotrichus externepunctatus (Reitter In Tschitscherine, 1899) 
 Dicheirotrichus glasunowi (Tschitscherine, 1899) 
 Dicheirotrichus godarti (E.Jacquet, 1882) 
 Dicheirotrichus grumi (Tschitscherine, 1899) 
 Dicheirotrichus gustavii Crotch, 1871 
 Dicheirotrichus hauseri (Reitter, 1894) (Trichosellus) 
 Dicheirotrichus henoni (Bedel In Tschitscherine, 1899) 
 Dicheirotrichus himalayanus Kataev & Wrase, 2006 
 Dicheirotrichus kozlowi (Tschitscherine, 1899) 
 Dicheirotrichus lacustris (L.Redtenbacher, 1858) 
 Dicheirotrichus latimanus Kataev & Wrase, 2006 
 Dicheirotrichus maculicollis (Reitter, 1894) 
 Dicheirotrichus mannerheimii (R.F.Sahlberg, 1844) 
 Dicheirotrichus medvedevi (Kabak & Kataev, 1993) 
 Dicheirotrichus microderus (Solsky, 1874) 
 Dicheirotrichus obscuricollis (Reitter In Tschitscherine, 1899) 
 Dicheirotrichus obscuricornis (Reitter In Tschitscherine, 1899) 
 Dicheirotrichus obsoletus (Dejean, 1829) 
 Dicheirotrichus pallidus (Dejean, 1829) 
 Dicheirotrichus parvicollis (Tschitscherine, 1900) 
 Dicheirotrichus placidus (Gyllenhal, 1827) 
 Dicheirotrichus potanini (Tschitscherine, 1899) 
 Dicheirotrichus punctatellus (Reitter, 1894) 
 Dicheirotrichus punicus Bedel, 1899 
 Dicheirotrichus roborowskii (Tschitscherine, 1899) 
 Dicheirotrichus rufithorax (C.R.Sahlberg, 1827) 
 Dicheirotrichus semenowi (Tschitscherine, 1899) 
 Dicheirotrichus sichuanensis Kataev & Wrase, 1996 
 Dicheirotrichus stenothorax (Kabak & Kataev, 1993) 
 Dicheirotrichus subangularis Kataev & Wrase, 2006 
 Dicheirotrichus tenuimanus Bates, 1873 
 Dicheirotrichus tolli Kataev & Shilenkov, 1996 
 Dicheirotrichus transcaspicus (Tschitscherine, 1899) 
 Dicheirotrichus tscheresovae (Komarov, 1995) 
 Dicheirotrichus tschitscherini (Reitter In Tschitscherine, 1899) 
 Dicheirotrichus ustulatus (Dejean, 1829)

References

Harpalinae